The Roberts Covered Bridge is a Burr Truss covered bridge in Preble County, Ohio near Eaton. It was built in 1829, and was listed on the National Register of Historic Places in 1971.

It was restored in 1962, and further repairs were made in 1974.

It is claimed to be the oldest covered bridge in Ohio, the second oldest covered bridge in the United States, and the oldest of the six remaining "double-barreled" covered bridges in the United States. It is closed to traffic.

References

External links

Covered bridges in Ohio
National Register of Historic Places in Preble County, Ohio
Buildings and structures completed in 1829